Angoville-sur-Ay is a former commune in the Manche department in the Normandy region in northwestern France. On 1 January 2016, it was merged into the commune of Lessay.

Population

See also
Communes of the Manche department

References

Former communes of Manche